Walter Jürgen Schmid (born 1946) is a German diplomat and the Ambassador Extraordinary and Plenipotentiary of the Federal Republic of Germany to the Holy See.

He was the german ambassador in Moscow from July 2005 – 2010, and he presented his Letter of Credence to then-President of Russia Vladimir Putin on 8 November 2005.

References 

1946 births
Living people
Ambassadors of Germany to Russia
Ambassadors of Germany to the Holy See